AUCC may refer to:

 Universities Canada, an organisation that represents colleges and universities of Canada
 African University College of Communications, a private tertiary institution at Adabraka, Accra, Ghana
 AU Conference Center and Office Complex, a building in Addis Ababa, Ethiopia that serves as the headquarters of the African Union